Calathus freyi is a species of ground beetle from the Platyninae subfamily that is endemic to Canary Islands.

References

freyi
Beetles described in 1941
Endemic beetles of the Canary Islands